Libreria Bozzi is the oldest bookshop in Italy. The bookshop is situated in via Cairoli in Genoa.

History 
The bookshop was founded by a Jewish French refugee from Briançon, Antone Beuf (Antonio Beuf), in 1810.
The bookshop was visited in the 19th century by the writers Stendhal, Alessandro Manzoni, Charles Dickens, Herman Melville and Henry James.

After Mario Bozzi's death, the bookshop passed to his son Tonino, who was president of the Italian Booksellers Association for 12 years. To this day, the bookshop incorporates a portion of the ancient cloister of the Church of San Siro, whose columns and even the remains of a Turkish bath are still visible.

The bookstore was visited on their trips to Genoa by Stendhal in 1837, Alessandro Manzoni in 1827, Charles Dickens, Herman Melville on April 12, 1857, and Henry James.

See also
 Books in Italy

External links 

 Official website

References 

19th-century establishments in Italy
Tourist attractions in Genoa
Bozzi
Companies based in Genoa
Antiquarian booksellers